University of Tartu Art Museum is an art museum in Tartu, Estonia founded in 1803 The museum is located in Main building of Tartu University. The museum is a branch of University of Tartu Museum. The chief of the museum is Mariann Raisma.

The museum has a permanent exhibition which consists of, amongst other objects, original size plaster cast copies of Archaic, Classical and Hellenistic Greece.

References

External links
 

Art museums and galleries in Estonia
Museums in Tartu
University of Tartu